Amlaq Qatih or Amlaq el Qatih is a Heavy Neolithic archaeological site of the Qaraoun culture that is located   northwest of Baaloul,  north of Qaraoun, Lebanon.

The site was discovered and collections made  by Henri Fleisch and Maurice Tallon in 1955. Materials recovered were found to be of a cream-coloured, cherty type of flint and were suggested to date from Acheulian, Heavy Neolithic and normal Neolithic periods and included a few Levallois cores.

References

Heavy Neolithic sites
Neolithic settlements
Paleolithic
Archaeological sites in Lebanon